Franz Bley was a German botanist and illustrator best known for his two-volume book Botanisches Bilderbuch für Jung und Alt , published in 1897-8 by Adolph Schumann of Leipzig and Gustav Schmidt of Berlin.

Each volume contains 24 plates showing nine species to a plate. Though small, the chromolithographs of the aquarelles by Franz Bley are precise and carefully coloured, giving an accurate idea of the plant. The book includes a few of the more common fungi. The descriptive text, in Gothic typeface, is by Hermann Berdrow, a prolific author from Berlin.

Books
"Leitenhamer Geschichten" – Andreas Weinberger
"Die heimische Pflanzenwelt in wichtigen Vertretern" – Franz Bley

External links
Botanisches Bilderbuch für Jung und Alt

References

19th-century German botanists
Year of birth missing
Year of death missing